The discography of Sonata Arctica includes ten studio albums, three live albums, two compilation albums, four EPs, twenty singles, four demos, two video albums and ten music videos.

Studio albums

Live albums

Compilation albums

Extended plays

Singles

Demos

Video albums

Music videos
 "Wolf & Raven" (2001)
 "Broken" (Live) (2003)
 "Don't Say a Word" (2004)
 "Paid in Full" (2007)
 "Flag in the Ground" (2009)
 "The Last Amazing Grays (Live)" (2011)
 "I Have a Right" (2012)
 "Shitload of Money" (2012)
 "Alone in Heaven" (2013)
 "The Wolves Die Young" (2014)
 "Cloud Factory" lyric video (2014)
 "Love" (2014)
 "Closer to an Animal" lyric video (2016)
 "Life" (2016)
 "Cold" (2019)
 "Who Failed the Most" (2019)
 "For the Sake of Revenge" (2022)

References

External links 
 

Heavy metal group discographies
Discographies of Finnish artists
Discography